La Course by Le Tour de France was an elite women's professional road bicycle race held in France. First held in 2014 as a one-day race on the Champs-Élysées in Paris, it has been part of the UCI Women's WorldTour since 2016 as a one or two day race. The race was organised by the Amaury Sport Organisation (ASO), the organisers of the Tour de France. It was replaced in 2022 by Tour de France Femmes, a multi day stage race organised by ASO.

History 
In 2013, professional cyclists Kathryn Bertine, Marianne Vos and Emma Pooley and professional triathlete Chrissie Wellington formed an activist group called Le Tour Entier (“the whole tour”), to petition ASO to launch a women's Tour de France. 

Following substantial media coverage, and a petition signed by over 100,000 people, ASO launched La Course by Tour de France in 2014. The race would be held in conjunction with the Tour de France, with the first edition taking place as a one-day race on the Champs-Élysées in advance of the final stage of the men's race. In subsequent years, the race took place in a variety of locations such as Pau, Col de la Colombière and Col d'Izoard in conjunction with the men's race, as the ASO argued that this was the "best way to shine a light on female cycling". The race was initially praised for the exposure gained by 'sharing the stage' with the Tour de France, with sponsors welcoming the visibility of the Champs-Élysées, and live TV coverage in conjunction with the Tour de France.

However, the races were criticised by riders, teams and the media. Some felt that the race was an 'after thought' and were overshadowed by the men's race. ASO were criticised for not doing enough to promote the race. The 2017 edition was specifically criticised for a lack of facilities for riders and teams, no support to get from the Col d'Izoard to Marseille, as well as issues regarding the pursuit time trial format in Marseille.  Riders noted that the stages weren't hard enough for the professional peloton, with former cyclist & commentator Joanna Rowsell stating that "We need mountain climbs, flat stages, time trials and a Champs-Elysees finish". 

The race was also criticised for not being a "full Tour de France", with campaigner Kathryn Bertine stating her disappointment that the race had not evolved into a multi day stage race. ASO stated that logistical issues mean that a men's and women's Tour de France would not be able to be staged simultaneously, and that any race must be financially sustainable.

In June 2021, ASO announced that the Tour de France Femmes - a multi day stage race - will take place for the first time in 2022. This new 8 day race took place following the Tour de France, replacing La Course.

Locations

Winners

A total of six of the eight editions were won by cyclists from the Netherlands.

Notes

References

External links 

 

 
UCI Women's World Tour races